KG United is a Kyrgyzstani football club based in Bishkek. It is made to support development of young players, as a farm club. This year play footballers born 1996, and younger.

History

Names
2013: Renamed FC-96 Bishkek
2014: Renamed FC Manas
2015: Renamed KG United

Domestic history

Links
 Article at Russian language (archived 20 February 2014)

Football clubs in Kyrgyzstan
Association football clubs established in 2012